Isabella of Portugal (Isabel in Portuguese and Spanish) (1428 – 15 August 1496) was Queen of Castile and León as the second wife of King John II. She was the mother of Queen Isabella I of Castile.

Queen
Isabella was born as a scion of a collateral branch of the Aviz dynasty that had ruled Portugal since 1385. Her parents were John, Constable of Portugal, the youngest surviving son of John I of Portugal, and his half-niece and wife, Isabella of Barcelos, the daughter of the Duke of Braganza, an illegitimate son of the king. She was married to King John II of Castile as his second wife. His first wife, Mary of Aragon, had given him four children, though only one, the future Henry IV of Castile, had survived. Henry had been joined to Blanche II of Navarre in an unconsummated marriage for seven years and was called "El Impotente." Because of this, John decided to seek another wife, preferably with a French princess. However, his trusted adviser and friend Alvaro de Luna decided a Portuguese alliance was better politically, and negotiated a match with the much younger Isabella. The two were wed on 22 July 1447 when John was 42 and Isabella 19.

Conflict with de Luna

De Luna had dominated the king since he was young and doubtless expected this to continue after the marriage. De Luna tried to control the young queen as well, even going as far as to attempt to limit the couplings between the amorous king and his bride. Isabella took exception to de Luna's influence over her husband and attempted to persuade her husband to remove this favourite.

Rumors that de Luna had attempted to poison Isabella, and that he had also poisoned and murdered her predecessor, Mary of Aragon, still persist to this day. Isabella, being aware of this, set herself to the task of persuading the king to agree to rid himself of de Luna.

She had little success until after the 1451 birth of her daughter and namesake who would become Isabella I of Castile. The queen's confinement was long and difficult.

In 1453, de Luna had nobleman Alfonso Pérez de Vivero thrown out of a window, as the nobleman had sided against the constable. Isabella used this as leverage, and convinced the king to have him arrested and tried. King John did as his wife asked, and de Luna was executed.

The death of his favourite saddened the king, and his health began to decline rapidly. John was on his deathbed in mid 1454, expiring at last on 20 July 1454. Henry IV, newly divorced from Blanche, became king.

Queen dowager
After Henry ascended the throne, he sent his stepmother, who was three years younger than himself, and his two half-siblings to the Castle of Arévalo. The dowager queen and her two children lived austerely with Isabella's mother, who had travelled to Arevalo to assist her. There is no evidence that the widowed queen ever considered remarrying.

While at Arévalo, Isabella sank deeper into the melancholy that had begun after the birth of her elder child. She was permitted to keep her children until 1461, the year in which Henry's second queen, Joan of Portugal, became pregnant with Joanna, Princess of Asturias, supposedly by her alleged lover, Beltrán de La Cueva.

Relationship with daughter
Alfonso had died under suspicious circumstances in 1468. In 1469, Isabella told her half-brother (Henry IV) that she was going to visit her mother in Arévalo, but in fact travelled to Valladolid to marry Ferdinand of Aragon, the heir of John II of Aragon. When Henry IV died in 1474, Isabella bypassed the claims of her niece, who had never been considered legitimate, to become Queen of Castile. During her travels around Spain, she would visit her mother every year or so, always waiting personally on her to show her respect. The Dowager queen continued to live in retirement until she died in 1496 "worn out and enfeebled by age".

Interment

After her death, she was interred next to her husband in the crypt under the royal sepulcher, with Alfonso whose tomb is placed to the side in the Miraflores Charterhouse. Her daughter Isabella raised ornately carved tombs in their memory.

In 2006, on the occasion of the restoration of the Charterhouse, an anthropological study of the physical remains of John II, Isabella, and their son, Alfonso of Castile was carried out by researchers from the University of León. The skeleton of King John II was almost complete, but only fragments of Queen Isabella's bones remained.

Issue
Her children were:

 Isabella I of Castile. Married Ferdinand II of Aragon, she became Queen of Castile and united Aragon with Castile.
 Alfonso, Prince of Asturias who rebelled against his half-brother, Henry IV of Castile He died of a sudden fever, perhaps for natural causes (plage) or perhaps for poisoning.

References

|-

1428 births
1496 deaths
15th-century Castilians
15th-century Portuguese people
15th-century Portuguese women
15th-century Spanish women
Burials at Miraflores Charterhouse
Castilian queen consorts
Galician queens consort
House of Aviz
Leonese queen consorts
Portuguese infantas
Portuguese people of English descent
Queen mothers